Gradski stadion (City stadium) is located right next to the sports center Jezero and Town Park. Its capacity is somewhere around 7,500 spectators. The stadium was built in 1922.

See also
 List of football stadiums in Serbia
 OFK Kikinda

Football venues in Serbia
Sport in Kikinda